Sofien Hakim Manessour (born 21 March 1987 in Marseille), known professionally as Soso Maness, is a French rapper of Algerian descent. He has released three albums, Rescapé in 2019, Mistral in 2020 and Avec le temps in 2021. Mistral reached number 2 on the French Albums Chart. His song "Petrouchka" featuring rapper PLK reached number 1 on the French Singles Chart.

Discography

Albums

Singles

Other charting songs

Featured in

References

Rappers from Bouches-du-Rhône
1987 births
Living people
Musicians from Marseille
French people of Algerian descent